is a railway station in Soo, Kagoshima, Japan.

Lines

Layout 
The station consists of two side platforms serving two tracks with a siding. The station building was rebuilt in 2008 and is a two-storey Japanese style building with a double tiled roof. It houses a waiting area, a restaurant and a community interaction centre but the ticket window is not staffed. Access to the opposite side platform is by means of a footbridge.

Platforms

JR

Adjacent stations

History
The station and the Kokutō East Line were then absorbed and were designated as part of the Nippō Main Line on 6 December 1932. With the privatization of Japanese National Railways (JNR), the successor of JGR, on 1 April 1987, the station came under the control of JR Kyushu.

Surrounding area
Soo City Hall Takarabe Branch
Soo City Takarabe Elementary School
Soo City Takarabe Junior High School
Takarabe Chūō Hospital
Takarabe Post office

See also
List of railway stations in Japan

References

External links 

Takarabe (JR Kyushu)

Railway stations in Japan opened in 1929
Railway stations in Kagoshima Prefecture